1893 Singapore Amateur Football Association Challenge Cup was the Second season of the Amateur Challenge Cup, the predecessor of the Singapore Cup.

The defending holders, Singapore Engineers were beaten 1–0 in the first round by Singapore Cricket Club., the latter making it to the finals, where they were beaten by the Royal Engineers by the same result.

Round 1

Semi-final

Replay

Second Replay

Final

References

Singapore - Singapore Cup tournaments - Additional Data 1892-1961, RSSSF.com

1893
1892–93 domestic association football cups
1893 in Singapore